The Wan Brothers were born in the early 20th century in Nanjing, China. They became the founders and pioneers of the Chinese animation industry and made the first  Asian animation feature-length film, Princess Iron Fan in 1941.

Background

The era in which the Wan brothers operated was a very challenging one for building an industry. China would endure the Second Sino-Japanese War, World War II and the Cultural Revolution.
They also made the famous cartoon animation, Havoc in Heaven.

The brothers

Parents

Their father was in the silk business. Their mother was a seamstress.

See also
Chinese animation
History of Chinese animation

References

Chinese animators
Film directors from Jiangsu
20th-century Chinese inventors
Cinema pioneers
Sibling filmmakers
Animation duos
Artists from Nanjing
Chinese film directors
Chinese silent film directors
Brothers
Chinese animated film directors
Chinese animated film producers